The 36th FIE Fencing World Cup began in October 2007 and concluded in September 2007 at the 2007 World Fencing Championships in Saint Petersburg, Russia.

Individual Épée

Individual Foil

Individual Sabre

Team Épée

Team Foil

Team Sabre

References 
 FIE rankings

Fencing World Cup
2006 in fencing
2007 in fencing
International fencing competitions hosted by Russia
2007 in Russian sport